Dasht Rural District is a rural district (dehestan) in the Central District of Shahreza County, Isfahan Province, Iran. At the 2006 census, its population was 4,853, in 1,311 families.  The rural district has 15 villages.

References 

Rural Districts of Isfahan Province
Shahreza County